The Academy of Motion Picture Arts and Sciences has had occurrences of actors nominated for two different Academy Awards in acting categories in a single year, with the first instance in 1938.

Provided that they receive enough votes from the Academy in both categories to earn a nomination, there are no restrictions on male actors being nominated for both Best Actor and Best Supporting Actor or actresses being nominated for both Best Actress and Best Supporting Actress in any given year. The only two rules with regard to multiple nominations is that an actor or actress cannot receive multiple nominations for different performances in the same category (one nomination must be for a lead role and the other must be for a supporting role), and they cannot receive multiple nominations for the same performance. The second rule was introduced in 1944 after Barry Fitzgerald received a Best Actor nomination and a Best Supporting Actor nomination for his performance in Going My Way.

, 12 actors and actresses have been nominated for two different Academy Awards in the same year. The first was Fay Bainter, who received nominations for her performances in White Banners and Jezebel at the 11th Academy Awards. The most recent occurrence was the 92nd Academy Awards when Scarlett Johansson received (her first ever) nominations for Marriage Story and Jojo Rabbit. Seven of these actors and actresses received an Academy Award in one of the categories they were nominated in, but none have won two Academy Awards in the same year. Five did not receive an Academy Award in either category: Sigourney Weaver (nominations for Gorillas in the Mist and Working Girl), Emma Thompson (nominations for The Remains of the Day and In the Name of the Father), Julianne Moore (nominations for Far from Heaven and The Hours), Cate Blanchett (nominations for Elizabeth: The Golden Age and I'm Not There) and Johansson. Thompson is notable for not only her dual nominations, but also for being the only person to win Academy Awards for both acting and writing.  In 1993, the only time to date, two actors were nominated in two categories each in a single year: Holly Hunter (for The Piano and The Firm) and Thompson (for The Remains of the Day and In the Name of the Father).

Nominees

See also

List of actors nominated for Academy Awards for non-English performances

References
General

Specific

External links
The Official Academy Awards Database

Academy Awards lists
Lists of film actors